The Montreal Cognitive Assessment (MoCA) is a widely used screening assessment for detecting cognitive impairment. It was created in 1996 by Ziad Nasreddine in Montreal, Quebec. It was validated in the setting of mild cognitive impairment (MCI), and has subsequently been adopted in numerous other clinical settings. This test consists of 30 points and takes 10 minutes for the individual to complete. The original English version is performed in seven steps, which may change in some countries dependent on education and culture. The basics of this test include short-term memory, executive function, attention, focus, and more.

Format
The MoCA is a one-page 30-point test administered in approximately 10 minutes. The test and administration instructions are available for clinicians online. The test is available in 46 languages and dialects (as of 2017).

The MoCA assesses several cognitive domains:
 The short-term memory recall task (5 points) involves two learning trials of five nouns and delayed recall after approximately five minutes.
 Visuospatial abilities are assessed using a clock-drawing task (3 points) and a three-dimensional cube copy (1 point).
 Multiple aspects of executive function are assessed using an alternation task adapted from the trail-making B task (1 point), a phonemic fluency task (1 point), and a two-item verbal abstraction task (2 points).
 Attention, concentration, and working memory are evaluated using a sustained attention task (target detection using tapping; 1 point), a serial subtraction task (3 points), and digits forward and backward (1 point each).
 Language is assessed using a three-item confrontation naming task with low-familiarity animals (lion, camel, rhinoceros; 3 points), repetition of two syntactically complex sentences (2 points), and the aforementioned fluency task.
 Abstract reasoning is assessed using a describe-the-similarity task with 2 points being available.
 Finally, orientation to time and place is evaluated by asking the subject for the date and the city in which the test is occurring (6 points).

Because MoCA is English-specific, linguistic and cultural translations are made in order to adapt the test in other countries. Multiple cultural and linguistic variables may affect the norms of the MoCA across different countries and languages, e.g. Swedish. Several cut-off scores have been suggested across different languages to compensate for the education level of the population, and several modifications were also necessary to accommodate certain linguistic and cultural differences across different languages or countries; however, not all versions have been validated.

Efficacy

MoCA test study
A MoCA test validation study by Nasreddine in 2005 showed that the MoCA was a promising tool for detecting MCI and early Alzheimer's disease compared with the well-known Mini-Mental State Examination (MMSE).

According to the validation study, the sensitivity and specificity of the MoCA for detecting MCI were 90% and 87% respectively, compared with 18% and 100% respectively for the MMSE. Subsequent studies in other settings were less promising, though generally superior to the MMSE.

Other studies have tested the MoCA on patients with Alzheimer's disease.

Recommendations
The National Institutes of Health and the Canadian Stroke Network recommended selected subsets of the MoCA for the detection of vascular cognitive impairment.

Scoring
MoCA scores range between 0 and 30. A score of 26 or over is considered to be normal. In a study, people without cognitive impairment scored an average of 27.4; people with MCI scored an average of 22.1; people with Alzheimer's disease scored an average of 16.2.

In a study by Ihle-Hansen et al. (2017), of 3,413 Norwegian participants aged 63–65, of whom 47% had higher education (over 12 years), under 5% of subjects scored 30/30 with a mean MoCA score of 25.3 and 49% scoring below the suggested cut-off of 26 points, leading the authors to suggest that "the cut-off score may have been set too high to distinguish normal cognitive function from MCI".

Other applications
Since the MoCA assesses multiple cognitive domains, it can be a useful cognitive screening tool for several neurological diseases that affect younger populations, such as Parkinson's disease, vascular cognitive impairment, Huntington's disease, brain metastasis, sleep behaviour disorder, primary brain tumors (including high- and low-grade gliomas), multiple sclerosis and other conditions such as traumatic brain injury, cognitive impairment from schizophrenia and heart failure. The test is also used in hospitals to determine whether patients should be allowed to live alone or with a home aide.

See also
 Mini–Mental State Examination (MMSE)
 Person, woman, man, camera, TV

References

External links
 Montreal Cognitive Assessment (MoCA) (PDF) Version 8.1 English

Mental disorders screening and assessment tools
Cognitive tests
Neuropsychological tests
Geriatrics
1996 introductions